Antti Heikkilä (born October 30, 1943 in Pori, Finland) is a Finnish former hockey player and hockey influencer. During his active career, he played as a defender.
Antti Heikkilä and his brother, Lasse, have been important influences in the development of ice hockey in the city of Pori.

Heikkilä played the 1966 World Ice Hockey Championships for Finland.  He was inducted into the Finnish Hockey Hall of Fame in 1988.

Career 
Antti Heikkilä played in Pori Karhut and Ässät for a total of 20 seasons from 1961 to 1981 SM-sarja and SM-liiga. He won three Finnish championships and a total of 6 medals. Heikkilä accumulated 561 matches and 144 + 116 points in the regular season. In addition, he played 29 playoff matches with 15 points. Ässät have retired Antti Heikkilä's number 2. Antti Heikkilä got to play in the national team in 11 U20 national matches, scoring 1 + 2. He represented Finland once at the World Championships, in 1966.

References

External links
 

1943 births
Ässät players
Finnish ice hockey players
Karhut Pori players
Sportspeople from Pori
Living people
Ice hockey players with retired numbers
Ässät coaches